Perry Anzilotti (born December 11, 1959) is an American television and film actor.

Early life and education
Anzilotti was born and raised in Chicago, Illinois. He attended the University of Illinois at Chicago, and is also a graduate of the California Institute of the Arts.

Career

Anzilotti played caveman Chang in the ABC-TV series Dinosaurs episode "The Mating Dance". He also made a guest appearance on the FOX TV series Married... with Children as Vito Capone, a local mobster and loan shark to whom Bud, in attempting to shoot an exercise video, becomes indebted.

Anzilotti is best known for his commercial work as "the Cookie Man" in the SnackWells Cookies TV commercial spots. His other television appearances include guest parts on HBO's Curb Your Enthusiasm, ABC-TV's Step by Step, CBS-TV's NCIS, Sydney, NBC-TV's ER, Empty Nest, Caroline in the City, Mad About You and Seinfeld.

Personal life
Anzilotti went into the edible cannabis business in 2016.

References

External links

American male film actors
American male television actors
1959 births
Male actors from Chicago
California Institute of the Arts alumni
University of Illinois Chicago alumni
Living people
20th-century American male actors
21st-century American male actors